Oberösterreichische Rundschau is a weekly newspaper in Upper Austria, published in 13 regional editions. In addition, there is a free Sunday newspaper Sonntags-Rundschau.

History and profile
Oberösterreichische Rundschau evolved as a merger of several regional papers, the oldest of which, the Innviertler Volkszeitung, existed already in 1880. It has been published under the name Oberösterreichische Rundschau since 1983. The paper is published weekly. The owner and publisher of the paper is Passauer Neue Presse.

Oberösterreichische Rundschau has three distinct products: First, 13 regional editions are issued once a week on Wednesday/Thursday.  Second, a free Sunday newspaper Sonntags-Rundschau is published. Third, the paper includes the classified ads supplement korrekt.

Oberösterreichische Rundschau reached approximately 676.000 readers in 2006. In 2007 the paper had a circulation of 255,000 copies.

Braunauer Rundschau
The Braunauer Rundschau was established in 1881. The paper appears in a charge of 19.000 pieces and reaches approximately 80 percent of all households in the district of Braunau am Inn. Moreover, Braunauer Rundschau covers adjacent areas such as the Salzburger Flachgau, as well as the Bavarian communities at the Inn and Salzach. This regional edition, except the printing, is completely produced in Braunau. Editorship leader is Reinhold Klika.

Other
 Freistädter Rundschau
 Grieskirchner / Eferdinger Rundschau
 Kremstaler Rundschau
 Linzer Rundschau
 Perger Rundschau
 Rieder Rundschau
 Rohrbacher Rundschau
 Salzkammergut Rundschau
 Steyrer Rundschau / Mostviertel
 Mostviertler Sonntags-Rundschau (Sundays only)
 Urfahrer Rundschau
 Vöcklabrucker Rundschau
 Welser Rundschau

References

External links 
Oberösterreichische Rundschau (in German)

Braunau am Inn
German-language newspapers published in Austria
Weekly newspapers published in Austria
Publications established in 1881
1881 establishments in Austria-Hungary
Establishments in the Empire of Austria (1867–1918)